Pietrari is a common  Romanian name and may refer to several places in Romania:

 Pietrari, a commune in Dâmbovița County
 Pietrari, a commune in Vâlcea County, and its village of Pietrarii de Sus
 Pietrari, a village in Păușești-Măglași Commune, Vâlcea County

See also 
 Piatra (disambiguation)
 Pietriș (disambiguation)
 Pietreni (disambiguation)
 Pietrosu (disambiguation)
 Pietrișu (disambiguation)
 Pietroasa (disambiguation)
 Pietroșani (disambiguation)
 Pietricica (disambiguation)